Surat Buhid is an Abugida used to write the Buhid language. As a Brahmic script indigenous to the Philippines, it closely related to Baybayin and Hanunó'o. It is still used today by the Mangyans, found mainly on island of Mindoro, to write their language, Buhid, together with the Filipino latin script.

There are efforts to reinvigorate the use of Surat Buhid. Buhid script use varies across Northern (Bansud area) and Southern Buhid (Bongabong) communities.

Structure 

The Buhid script has 18 independent characters; 15 are consonants and 3 vowels. As an abugida, there are additional diacritic vowels. Consonants have an inherent /a/ vowel. The other two vowels are indicated by a diacritic above (for /i/) or below (for /u/) the consonant. Depending on the consonant, ligatures are formed, changing the shape of the consonant-vowel combination. Vowels at the beginning of syllables are represented by their own, independent characters. Syllables ending in a consonant are written without the final consonant.

Letters 
The letter order of Buhid, recorded in Unicode, is based on phonetic principles that consider both the manner and place of articulation of the consonants and vowels they represent.

Vowels

Consonants 

Note: With the proper rendering support, the Buhid syllable ki above (ᝃᝒ) should resemble a plus sign (+).

Buhid writing makes use of single (᜵) and double (᜶) punctuation marks.

Unicode 

Buhid script was added to the Unicode Standard in March, 2002 with the release of version 3.2.

The Unicode block for Buhid is U+1740–U+175F:

See also

Kulitan 
Kawi script
Tagbanwa alphabet
Filipino orthography

References

External links
About Buhid in omniglot.com

Philippine scripts
Brahmic scripts